Lemon Popsicle is a 1978 teen comedy-drama film co-written and directed by Boaz Davidson. The success of the film led to a series of sequels. The cult film follows a group of three teenage boys in late-1950s Tel Aviv.

Plot
In 1950s Israel, Nili (Niki in the English-language release) is the new girl at school. She meets a trio of friends: Benzi (Benji in the English release), Momo (Bobby in the English release) and Yudale (Huey in the English release). Benzi, the typical "nice guy" of the group, immediately falls in love with Nili. However, Nili prefers the more aggressive and experienced Momo. Learning that Nili is a virgin, Momo brags to his friends that he will seduce, then dump her, much to Benzi's dismay. However, Benzi is too dependent on his friends and too reluctant to ruin their friendship to warn Nili of Momo's intentions, and must watch as Momo and Nili begin dating. Momo finally takes Nili's virginity, leaving her pregnant. Benzi rushes in to emotionally console Nili and helps her to get an abortion, hoping that she will grow to love him for his support, only to be crushed when Nili and Momo reconcile and resume dating.

The film contains a scene with an older olah named Stella, enticing the three boys into having sex with her, earning the nickname "Stella HaMegameret" ("A-cumming Stella") after she screams "I'm a-cumming! I'm a-cumming!" (instead of "cumming") during sex because of her poor Hebrew.

Cast
  as Bentzi
 Jonathan Sagall as Momo
 Zachi Noy as Yudale
 Anat Atzmon as Nili
  as Stella
 Rachel Steiner as Martha
 Dvora Kedar as Sonja
 Menashe Warshavsky as Romek
 Denise Bouzaglo as Ricki

Release and reception

Budget
The picture was produced at a budget of IL3 million, of which a million was paid in royalties to the musicians (mostly American) whose songs were used in the soundtrack (such as Bill Haley, Paul Anka, Little Richard, Frankie Laine, the Chordettes and Bobby Vinton). Producer Menahem Golan claimed that the music rights cost more than the production of the film itself.

Box office
Lemon Popsicle became an immediate commercial success; by December 1978, the film had sold 1,268,000 tickets in its native country and grossed IL12.5 million. It was circulated in 700 prints in Europe, where it earned $650,000 during the same period. In total, it sold 1,350,000 tickets in the state, becoming the highest-grossing Israeli picture in history. In West Germany, it reached the 11th place at the 1978 box office, with 2.7 million tickets sold. Lemon Popsicle also gained considerable popularity in the rest of Europe and in Japan. It was nominated for the Golden Globe Award for Best Foreign Language Film in the 36th Golden Globe Awards, losing to Ingmar Bergman's Autumn Sonata. The film was also selected as the Israeli entry for the Best Foreign Language Film at the 51st Academy Awards, but was not accepted as a nominee.

Sequels
The series became a success in Germany under the name Eis am Stiel. Most of the films were also dubbed into English and were released in both the United States and United Kingdom. Since the release of Lemon Popsicle, seven official sequels have been made. These were Going Steady (Yotzim Kavua) (1979), Hot Bubblegum (Shifshuf Naim) (1981), Private Popsicle (Sapiches) (1982), Baby Love (Roman Za'ir) (1984), Up Your Anchor (Harimu Ogen) (1985), Young Love (Ahava Tzeira) (1987) and Summertime Blues (Blues La-Kayitz) (1988). A spin-off film, Private Manoeuvres (Sababa), starring Zachi Noy as Yudale, appeared in 1983, and a reboot film, The Party Goes On (Hahagiga Nimshehet), which featured Noy as a restaurant owner, was released in 2001.

Hot Bubblegum

Hot Bubblegum (Hebrew: Shifshuf Naim) is the third film in the Lemon Popsicle series, set in Tel Aviv and released in 1981.

Synopsis
Three high school seniors preparing for final exams in the early 1960s have the normal teenage concerns about girls, sex and relationships. They try to find out if going steady with one girlfriend is better or if changing girlfriends all the time makes for too many complications. By the end of summer, all things get better.

Cast
 Yftach Katzur as Benzi
 Zachi Noy as Yudale
 Jonathan Sagall as Momo
 Dvora Kedar as Sonja
 Orna Dagan as Nikki
 Rachel Steiner as Martha
 Ariella Rabinovich as Doris
 Sibylle Rauch as Frieda
 Christiane Schmidtmer as Fritzi

Remake
In 1982, Davidson wrote and directed an American remake, The Last American Virgin, starring Lawrence Monoson and Diane Franklin.

See also
 Israeli cinema
 List of submissions to the 51st Academy Awards for Best Foreign Language Film
 List of Israeli submissions for the Academy Award for Best Foreign Language Film

References

External links

 Lemon Popsicle Forever
 Lemon Popsicle Fanzine
 
 
 
 
 
 
 
 
 
 
 

 
1978 films
1978 comedy-drama films
1978 romantic comedy films
1978 romantic drama films
1970s coming-of-age comedy-drama films
1970s German films
1970s romantic comedy-drama films
1970s sex comedy films
1970s teen comedy-drama films
1970s teen romance films
Coming-of-age romance films
Films about abortion
Films about virginity
Films directed by Boaz Davidson
Films produced by Menahem Golan
Films produced by Yoram Globus
Films set in the 1950s
Films set in Tel Aviv
Films with screenplays by Boaz Davidson
German coming-of-age comedy-drama films
German romantic comedy-drama films
German teen comedy-drama films
Golan-Globus films
Israeli comedy-drama films
Israeli coming-of-age drama films
Israeli teen drama films
Teen sex comedy films
West German films